Jeff Kalani Pahukoa (born February 9, 1969) is a former American football offensive lineman in the National Football League. He played five seasons for the Los Angeles Rams (1991–1993) and Atlanta Falcons (1995–1996).

References

1969 births
Living people
American football offensive linemen
Atlanta Falcons players
Los Angeles Rams players
Washington Huskies football players
People from Marysville, Washington
Sportspeople from Vancouver, Washington
Players of American football from Washington (state)
Native Hawaiian sportspeople